The Preppie Connection is a 2015 crime drama film co-written and directed by Joseph Castelo, based on the infamous 1984 incident where Choate Rosemary Hall student Derek Oatis, along with a handful of friends, ran a cocaine smuggling operation on the school's campus. The film stars Thomas Mann, Lucy Fry, Logan Huffman, Sam Page, Jessica Rothe, and Bill Sage. It had world premiere at the Hamptons International Film Festival on October 10, 2015. It was released in the United States on March 18, 2016, in select theaters and through video on demand by IFC Films.

Premise
In 1984 New Haven, Connecticut, a private school student uses connections to create a drug trafficking network at his school which leads him and his friends into the dangerous world of drug cartels.

Cast

Production
In January 2013, it was announced that Evan Peters, Bella Heathcote had been cast in the lead roles of Tobias and Alex respectively, and the project had been written and directed by Joseph Castelo.
However, either Peters and Heathcote dropped out or were recast, in July 2014, Lucy Fry was cast in the role of Alexis. The following day, it was announced that Thomas Mann and Logan Huffman had joined the cast of the film.

Filming
Principal photography took place in New York City from July 21 to August 9, 2014. with production beginning in Puerto Rico on August 12, 2014.

Release
The film had its world premiere at the Hamptons International Film Festival on October 10, 2015. It was also screened at the Mill Valley Film Festival on October 15, 2015. In December 2015, IFC Films acquired distribution rights to the film. The film was released on March 18, 2016, in select theaters and through video on demand.

Critical reception
The Preppie Connection received negative reviews from film critics. It holds an 11% approval rating on review aggregator website Rotten Tomatoes, based on 9 reviews, with an average rating of 5/10. On Metacritic, the film holds a rating of 34 out of 100, based on 6 critics, indicating "generally unfavorable reviews".

Dennis Harvey of Variety gave the film a negative review writing: "Unconvincingly presented in a way that belies the factual basis of a case that won national notoriety at the time, the film will make serviceable small-screen fodder, but lacks the deeper insight or distinguishing directorial style that might have tempted arthouse distributors."

References

External links
 
 
 
 

2015 films
2015 crime drama films
2010s teen drama films
American crime drama films
American films based on actual events
American independent films
American teen drama films
Crime films based on actual events
Drama films based on actual events
Films about cocaine
Films about the illegal drug trade
Films about the upper class
Films set in 1984
Films set in Connecticut
Films shot in New York City
Films shot in Puerto Rico
French crime drama films
English-language French films
French films based on actual events
French independent films
French teen drama films
Teen crime films
2010s English-language films
2010s American films
2010s French films